Pushepatapa Creek is a stream in the U.S. state of Louisiana.

Pushepatapa is a name most likely derived from the Choctaw language; it's purported to mean "sandy bottom". Variant names are "Poosheepatapa Creek", "Poosheepatopa Creek", "Pushapatappa Creek", "Pushepetapa Creek", "Pushepetappy Creek", and "Pushpetappy Creek".

References

Rivers of Louisiana
Rivers of Washington Parish, Louisiana
Louisiana placenames of Native American origin